is a Shinto shrine in Kamigyō-ku, Kyoto, Japan.

History

The shrine was first built in 947 to appease the angry spirit of bureaucrat, scholar and poet Sugawara no Michizane, who had been exiled as a result of political maneuvers of his enemies in the Fujiwara clan.

The shrine became the object of Imperial patronage during the early Heian period.  In 965, Emperor Murakami ordered that Imperial messengers be sent to report important events to the guardian kami of Japan. These messengers initially presented gifts called  to 16 shrines; and in 991, Emperor Ichijō added three more shrines to Murakami's list — including Kitano.

Tenjin
The shrine was dedicated to Michizane; and in 986, the scholar-bureaucrat was deified and the title of "Tenjin" was conferred.

The grounds are filled with Michizane's favorite tree, the red and white ume or plum blossom, and when they blossom the shrine is often very crowded.  The Plum Blossom Festival (梅花祭, baikasai) is held on February 25, coinciding with the monthly market.  An open-air tea ceremony (野点, nodate) is hosted by geiko and apprentice maiko from the nearby Kamishichiken district, where tea and wagashi are served to 3,000 guests by geisha and maiko. The plum festival has been held on the same day every year for about 900 years to mark the death of Michizane. The outdoor tea ceremony dates back to 1952. In that year, a big festival was held to mark the 1,050th anniversary of Michizane's death, based on the historic Kitano Ochakai tea ceremony hosted at the shrine by Toyotomi Hideyoshi.

Kitano Tenmangū is popular with students praying for success in exams because the deity was in his life a man of literature and knowledge. On the 25th of every month, the shrine hosts a flea market. Together with the similar festival at Tō-ji, a temple in the same city, they inspired the Kyoto proverb, "Fair weather at the Tōji market means rainy weather at the Tenjin market," calling to mind Kyoto's fickle weather.

See also

 List of Shinto shrines
 Twenty-Two Shrines
 List of National Treasures of Japan (shrines)
 List of National Treasures of Japan (paintings)
 Modern system of ranked Shinto Shrines
 Three Great Tenjin Shrines

Notes

References
 Breen, John and Mark Teeuwen. (2000).  Shinto in History: Ways of the Kami. Honolulu: University of Hawaii Press. 
 Ponsonby-Fane, Richard. (1962).   Studies in Shinto and Shrines. Kyoto: Ponsonby Memorial Society. OCLC 399449
 . (1959).  The Imperial House of Japan. Kyoto: Ponsonby Memorial Society. OCLC 194887
 . (1964).  Visiting Famous Shrines in Japan. Kyoto: Ponsonby-Fane Memorial Society.

External links 

 Kitano Tenmangū Official web page  
 Kyoto Shimbun: Open-Air Tea Ceremony... 

Beppyo shrines

Religious buildings and structures completed in 947
Shinto shrines in Kyoto
National Treasures of Japan
Important Cultural Properties of Japan
10th-century establishments in Japan
Sugawara no Michizane
Tenjin faith